Jaana Susanna Emilia Alakoski Söderlund, née Alakoski, (born 16May 1962 in Vaasa, Finland) is a Swedish-Finnish author, Novelist and lecturer. She won the August Prize in 2006 for the novel Svinalängorna. Svinalängorna was filmed in 2010 as Beyond. She researches gender issues and works as a social worker.

Biography 
Alakoski was born in 1962 in Vaasa, Finland and spent her early life in the Fridhem area in Ystad, Sweden. She studied to become a socionom and finished her degree at the age of 23. In 1988, she studied writing at Skurups folkhögskola. Between 1995 and 2003, she worked as a press secretary for the Vänsterpartiet politician Gudrun Schyman.

In 2006, she released her debut novel Svinalängorna. It took the August Prize in 2006. The novel sold over 400,000 copies in Sweden and it has been made into a feature film with the English title of Beyond.

In 2010, she released her second novel, Håpas du trifs bra i fengelset. In 2011, she released her first children's novel, Dagens Harri, which were followed by Guldfisken in 2012 and Dagens skräckis in 2013. She published a diary, Oktober i Fattigsverige in 2012.

She has also been editor for the anthologies Tala om klass, Lyckliga slut, and Fejkad orgasm

Personal life 
She is married to Mats Söderlund since 1990. They have three children, Jaana-Kristina, Nilas, Runa.

, she lives in Stockholm.

Bibliography – a selection 
Svinalängorna (2006)
Håpas du trifs bra i fengelset (2010)
Dagens Harri (2011)
Guldfisken (2012)
Oktober i Fattigsverige (2012)
Dagens skräckis (2013)

References 

21st-century Finnish women writers
August Prize winners
Finnish women novelists
Swedish women novelists
1962 births
Living people
People from Vaasa
Moa Award recipients
Swedish people of Finnish descent
21st-century Finnish novelists